Lot 47 is a township in Kings County, Prince Edward Island, Canada.  It is part of East Parish. Lot 47 was awarded to Gordon Graham and Robert Porter in the 1767 land lottery.

References

47
Geography of Kings County, Prince Edward Island